Wolfgang Rottmann (born May 15, 1973 in Altenmarkt im Pongau) is a former biathlete from Austria.

As the result of a doping scandal at the 2006 Winter Olympics, the IOC banned Rottmann for life from competing in the Olympics.

Career
World Championships
2000 - gold medal on the 20 km
2005 - bronze medal on the relay

References

 
 

1973 births
Living people
Austrian male biathletes
Austrian sportspeople in doping cases
Biathletes at the 1998 Winter Olympics
Biathletes at the 2002 Winter Olympics
Biathletes at the 2006 Winter Olympics
Olympic biathletes of Austria
Doping cases in biathlon
Biathlon World Championships medalists
People from St. Johann im Pongau District
Sportspeople from Salzburg (state)